Zhang Bing may refer to:

 Bing Zhang, Chinese astrophysicist
 Zhang Bing (sports shooter), Chinese sports shooter